Chwolson is a surname. Notable people with the surname include:

Daniel Chwolson (1819–1911), Russian-Jewish orientalist
Orest Chwolson (1852–1934), Russian physicist, one of the first to study the gravitational lens effect